Regla Torres Herrera (born February 12, 1975 in Havana) is a Cuban volleyball player who has won three Olympic gold medals with her first being at the young, for volleyball, age of 17. She has played on the international circuit since she was 14. In 2001, she was recipient of the Best Player of the 20th Century award by the FIVB and was inducted into the Volleyball Hall of Fame.

Awards

References

External links
 Regla Torres at the International Volleyball Federation
 

1975 births
Cuban women's volleyball players
Volleyball players at the 1992 Summer Olympics
Volleyball players at the 1996 Summer Olympics
Volleyball players at the 2000 Summer Olympics
Olympic volleyball players of Cuba
Olympic gold medalists for Cuba
Sportspeople from Havana
Living people
Olympic medalists in volleyball
Medalists at the 2000 Summer Olympics
Medalists at the 1996 Summer Olympics
Medalists at the 1992 Summer Olympics
Middle blockers
Pan American Games medalists in volleyball
Pan American Games gold medalists for Cuba
Medalists at the 1991 Pan American Games
Medalists at the 1995 Pan American Games